Voacanga thouarsii, the wild frangipani, is a species of small tree in the family Apocynaceae.

Description
Its fragrant flowers feature a pale green, creamy or white corolla.

Distribution and habitat
Voacanga thouarsii grows natively in tropical and southern Africa and in Madagascar. Its habitat is forest and savanna from sea-level to  altitude.

Uses
Local medicinal uses of Voacanga thouarsii include as a treatment for wounds, sores, gonorrhoea, eczema, heart problems, hypertension, rheumatism, stomach-ache and snakebite.

References

thouarsii
Flora of Africa
Plants used in traditional African medicine